SM Life Design Group is a South Korean printing, content distribution, and production company under SM Studios, a wholly-owned subsidiary of SM Entertainment. It was originally founded in 1998 as KD Media and was acquired by FNC Entertainment as FNC Add Culture in 2016.

History

1998–2018: Establishment and acquisition by FNC Entertainment 
In December of 1998, KD Media was established when the lottery business was spun-off from the publishing house of the with then Korea Daily News, as it was formerly a company specialized in the printing and supplying markets. Before the spin-off, it had been spending and owing more money than is being earned for a long time, but through restructuring, it posted a net profit of 1.3 billion won in 1999, a year after its establishment, and had steadily increased its surplus. In April 2000, the company launched its video business division and has grown into one of the top three major DVD publishing companies in South Korea in three years. It had also established a one-stop system such as planning, purchasing copyrights, production, and distribution in relation to DVD business. The division had its first sales in August, earning 690 million won through distribution of its first film. KD Media held a general meeting of shareholders at the KD Media headquarters in Paju-si, Gyeonggi-do on July 8, 2016 along with the proposal to change the company name to FNC Add Culture. It was also announced that the largest shareholder of the company was changed from NZKD One Investment Group to FNC Entertainment and seven other members through third-party allocation with capital increase and stock transfer contract.

2018–present: Acquisition by SM Entertainment and restructuring 
SM Entertainment announced on the March 14, 2018 that it had acquired actor management company KeyEast and FNC Add Culture, a subsidiary of FNC Entertainment. By May 18, SM secured a 31 percent stake in FNC Add Culture and changed its name to SM Life Design Group at the same time as it completed its acquisition process, with FNC becoming the second-largest shareholder with an 18 percent stake. Ahn Seok-joon, who also served as the chief executive officer (CEO) of FNC, will support the business alliance linking FNC and SM based on his experience as a management advisor of SM Life Design Group. Through SM Life Design Group, FNC and SM have established a family relationship and are expected to complete a "powerful" lineup by creating various business synergies in the domestic entertainment industry. In addition, FNC acquired FNC Production, an entertainment production subsidiary of SM Life Design Group, and plans to continue the partnership with the media production business and its artists to carry out the drama production business. At the end of March 2020, Shin Sung-bok, a business planning operator who previously worked for Samsung Life Insurance, Bokwang Investment, ISU Venture Capital, and M-Venture Investment, was appointed as the new CEO of SM Life Design group. In the industry, Shin is said to have reorganized SM Life Design Group's existing business divisions.

On January 10, 2022, SM Life Design announced that the company held a shareholders' meeting to appoint Tak Young-jun, a chief marketing officer (CMO) of SM Entertainment, was appointed as an inside director in the company and took the position of CEO through a resolution of the board of directors. Former CEO Shin resigned as the company's inside director and CEO on the same day of the announcement. Additionally, the company appointed chief financial officer (CFO) Nam Hwa-min as its new inside director in addition to Tak. As SM Entertainment's subsidiaries have divided roles into drama content production, such as KeyEast, and food service and subsidiary businesses, such as SM Life Design Group, the company's drama business was suspended, and its incorporation with Film Boutique was sold. With its restructuring of the business sector and suspension of drama production, SM Life Design Group instead acquired a 100% stake in Beacon Holdings, Tomatillo Korea, and MOA L&B International.

Subsidiaries 

 MOA L&B International (2019)
 Beacon Holdings (2019)

Production works

People 
All names listed are adapted from SM Life Design Group's drama business page of its official website.

Director 

 Shin Woo-chul

Screenwriters 

 Kim Soon-ok
 Baek Young-sook
 Lee Yu-jin
 Jang Hyun-joo

Notes

References

External links 
 Official website

SM Entertainment subsidiaries
South Korean companies established in 1998
Film distributors of South Korea
Film production companies of South Korea
Home video distributors
Logistics companies of South Korea
Printing companies
Television production companies of South Korea
Companies listed on KOSDAQ